The following are international rankings of Russia.

Freedom assessments 

The freedom indices produced by several non-governmental organizations publishes assessments of political rights and civil liberties for countries around the world. In 2021, Freedom House gave Russia a global freedom score of 20 out of 100, Reporters Without Borders’ Press Freedom Index ranked Russia 150 of 180 countries, and the Economist Intelligence Unit’s Democracy Index gave Russia a score of 3.31 and a rank of 124 of 167 countries.

Agriculture

Largest barley producer, output of 15.7 million metric (2007)
Largest buckwheat producer, output of 1 004 850 (2007)
Largest oats producer, output of 5.1 million metric tons (2005)
Largest rye producer, output of 3.6 million metric tons (2005)
Largest sunflower seed producer, output of 6.3 million metric tons (2005)
Largest currant and gooseberry producer, output of  463,500 tons (2005)
Largest raspberry producer, output of 110,000 tons (2004)
Largest vetches producer, output of 377,750 tons
Largest livestock of domesticated reindeer, about two-thirds of the world's

Cities
GaWC Inventory of World Cities, 1999: Moscow 7 points, Alpha World City
GaWC Inventory of World Cities, 1999: St. Petersburg 1 point, Minimal evidence of world city formation

Economic

 The Wall Street Journal and the Heritage Foundation: Index of Economic Freedom 2006, ranked 122 out of 157 countries
International Monetary Fund: GDP (nominal) per capita 2006, ranked 59 out of 182 countries
International Monetary Fund: GDP (nominal) 2009, ranked 8 out of 181 countries
World Economic Forum: Global Competitiveness Index 2006-2007, ranked 62 out of 125 countries

Demographics
 United Nations: Human Development Index 2006, ranked 65 out of 177 countries
 A.T. Kearney/Foreign Policy Magazine: Globalization Index 2006, ranked 47 out of 62 countries
Highest crude divorce rate, 4.42 per 1000 (2004)

Energy
Largest proven natural gas reserves, 44,650,000,000,000 m³ (2008)
Largest natural gas producer, 654,000,000,000 m³ (2007)
Largest natural gas exporter, 173,000,000,000 cu m (2007)
Largest oil producer,  (2009)

Environment
Yale University Environmental Performance Index 2014: ranked 73 out of 178 countries

E-Government
United Nations E-Government Survey 2014: not ranked in top 10 countries

Geography
Largest forest area, 8,087,900 km²
Largest land area, 17,075,200 km²
Largest total area, 17,098,242 km²
Largest EEZ continental shelf area,  3,817,843 km2
Largest unfrozen freshwater reserves, approximately one-quarter of the world's
Most countries bordered, 14 (16 if Abkhazia and South Ossetia are counted), the same number as with China
Most time zones (contiguous territory), 9

Military
Largest nuclear arsenal, 5,200 / 8,800 active/total warheads (2005 est)
Largest tank army, 22,800 tanks

Mining
Largest asbestos producer, 925,000 tons (2005)
Largest diamond producer, 38,000,000 carats (2005)
Largest nickel producer, 300,000 tons (2005)
Largest palladium producer, 143 tons (2005)

Society
Economist Intelligence Unit: Quality-of-life index 2005, ranked 102 out of 108 countries

Sports
Top position at World Chess Rankings (men), top 10 players average score of 2724 (2009)
Top position at World Chess Rankings (women), top 10 players average score of 2469 (2009)
Russia/USSR: Most Winter Olympic gold medals,  120 (2008)
Russia/USSR: Winner of most Bandy World Championships (men), 19 (1957, 1961, 1963, 1965, 1967, 1969, 1971, 1973, 1975, 1977, 1979, 1985, 1989, 1991, 1999, 2001, 2006, 2007, 2008) (as of 2009)
Russia/USSR: Most World Chess Champions, 10 (as of 2009)
Russia/USSR: Best performance at UCI Track World Championships, Women (cycling), 48 gold medals, 111 total medals (2009)
Russia/USSR: Best performance at FIE World Championships in Fencing, 121 gold medals, 257 total medals (2009)
Russia/USSR: Best performance at World Figure Skating Championships, 74 gold medals, 178 total medals, (2009)
Russia/USSR: Best performance at World Artistic Gymnastics Championships, 138 gold medals, 333 total medals (2009)
Russia/USSR: Best performance at World Rhythmic Gymnastics Championships, 23 gold medals, 58 total medals (2009)
Russia/USSR: Best performance at gymnastics Trampoline World Championships, 21 gold medals (2009)
Russia/USSR: Best performance at World Women's Handball Championship, 7 gold medals, 10 total medals (2009)
Russia/USSR: Winner of most Ice Hockey World Championships (men), 25 times winner (2009)
Russia/USSR: Best performance at Team Ice Racing World Championship, 26 times winner, (2009)
Russia/USSR: Best performance at World Shooting Championships, 307 gold medals, 656 total medals (2009)
Russia/USSR: Best performance at World Allround Speed Skating Championships for Women, 24 gold medals, 69 total medals (2009)
Russia/USSR: Best performance at World Sprint Speed Skating Championships for Men, 11 gold medals, 24 total medals (2009)
Russia/USSR: Winner of most Volleyball World Championships (men), 6 (1949, 1952, 1960, 1962, 1978, 1982) (2006)
Russia/USSR: Winner of most Volleyball World Championships (women), 6 (1952, 1956, 1960, 1970, 1990, 2006) (2006)
Russia/USSR: Winner of most Volleyball World Cups (men), 5 (1965, 1977, 1981, 1991, 1999) (2009)
Russia/USSR: Best performance at World Weightlifting Championships (men), 350 gold medals, 746 total medals (2007)
Russia/USSR: Best performance at FILA Wrestling World Championships, 64 times winner in three team tournaments (2009)

Technology
Economist Intelligence Unit e-readiness rankings 2007, ranked 57 out of 69 countries
Most television broadcast stations,  7,306 (as of 1998)
Most space launches per year, 32 in 2009

Transport
Largest total length of electrified railways, over 44,000 km

See also
Lists of countries
Lists by country
List of international rankings

References

Russia